The La Jolla Beach and Tennis Club is a private social club located on the shores of the La Jolla area of San Diego, California.

History
The first foundation for the club began in 1927, when the area was designated for a private yacht club.  The land was purchased in 1935 by newspaperman Frederick William Kellogg, who began developing the property into what it is today.  As of 2018, the club is still owned by the Kellogg family.

Overview
The  Beach and Tennis Club acts as both a private club and resort, and includes 90 guest rooms open to the public, a stretch of beach, a nine-hole pitch-and-putt golf course, and an outdoor, heated swimming pool.
The club hosted a first-round tie of the 2006 Davis Cup between the United States and Romania, and hosted a first round tie of the 2008 Fed Cup between the United States and Germany.

References

External links 
Website

Tennis venues in California
La Jolla, San Diego
Sports in San Diego
Organizations based in San Diego